Band Internacional is a Pay-TV channel of the Brazilian conglomerate Bandeirantes, for Brazilians living abroad.

Launch and content 
The channel is currently available in five countries: United States (the first country of reach, in which it was launched in 2007), Angola, Mozambique (2009), Paraguay (2011), Argentina  Uruguay (2016).

The channel has a differentiated programming for transmitting programs also of channels BandSports, BandNews TV and Arte 1; all issuers belonging to the Grupo Bandeirantes; besides the signal of Band TV.

TV Shows 

 Conexão Imigração USA hosted by Immigration Attorney Renata Castro, Esq.

Correspondents 
 New York - Murilo Borges
 Washington, D.C. - Nuria Saldanha
 Paris - Sonia Blota
 London - Felipe Kieling

References

External links 
  on Facebook
  Official Website
 Conexão Imigração USA on Instagram

Rede Bandeirantes
Mass media companies established in 2007
International broadcasters
Cable television in the United States
Television channels in Angola
Television channels in Mozambique